Kozhikode Abdul Kader (Malayalam: കോഴിക്കോട്  അബ്ദുൾ  കാദർ) (born Lesli Andrews) was an Indian playback singer who was active in Malayalam cinema during the 1950s. He had sung for eight films and many dramas. One of his most popular songs is "Engane Nee Marakkum Kuyile" from the 1954 film Neelakuyil.

Biography
He was born to J. S. Andrews and Manini on 19 July 1915 as Lesli Andrews. His mother died when he was very young. He converted to Islam and rechristened as Abdul Kader when he landed up in Burma. He was disowned by his father when he returned and was supported by a policeman named Kunjumuhammed who also fostered M. S. Baburaj who would later become a famed music composer.

He was first noticed by the music director V. Dakshinamoorthy who made him sing in the Malayalam film Navalokam in 1951.

Kader became a popular singer with the song "Engane Nee Marakkum Kuyile" from Neelakuyil (1954). Kader was fondly referred to as Malabar Saigal.

He married Achumma and has six children with her: Najmal Babu (Who was also a popular singer), Surayya, Moli, Zeenath, Naseema and Nasar. He met actress Santha Devi in 1948 and started to live with her and  they had a son named Satyajith, who was also a singer by profession. Abdul Kader died on 13 February 1977. 
In 2008 Nadeem Noushad, a documentary film maker, has made  a documentary film on Kozhikode Abdul Kadar titled Desh Raagathil Oru Jeevitham.

List of songs
A partial list of songs recorded by Kozhikode Abdul Kader:

 Navalokam (1951) – "Thangakinakkal", "Parithaapamithe haa Jeevithame"
 Thiramala (1953) – "Hey Kaliyodame"
 Neelakuyil (1954) – "Engane Nee Marakkum Kuyile"
 Manikya Kottaram (1966) – "Nakshathrapunnukalaayiram"
 Minnaaminung – "Ithranaal Ithranaal", "Nee Enthariyunnu Neela Tharagamey", "Enthinu Kavilil Baashpadhaaraa"
 Nammalonnu (A play by Cherukad) – "Pachcha Panamthathe"
 Achan (1952) – "Dhaivame Karunaa Saagarame"
 "Paadanorthoru Madhura Geetham"
 "Nammude Janaadhipathya Keralam Vannale Pinne Njangal Nadakkum Aanungale Pole"

References

External links

Further reading

1916 births
1977 deaths
Indian male singer-songwriters
Indian singer-songwriters
Malayalam playback singers
Singers from Kerala
20th-century Indian Muslims
Converts to Islam
Indian male playback singers
Musicians from Kozhikode
20th-century Indian singers
Film musicians from Kerala
20th-century Indian male singers